Lectionary 253, designated by siglum ℓ 253 (in the Gregory-Aland numbering) is a Greek manuscript of the New Testament, on parchment. It is dated by a colophon to the year 1020. Scrivener labelled it as 196evl.

Description 

The codex contains lessons from the Gospels lectionary (Evangelistarium), with numerous lacunae,
on 169 parchment leaves. It contains 174 lessons from the Gospel of John.

The text is written in Greek large minuscule letters, in two columns per page, 19-21 lines per page. It has breathings; error of itacism.

The lessons of the codex were red from Easter to Pentecost.

In John 14:14 the entire verse is omitted along with the manuscripts: X f1 565 1009 1365 ℓ 76 Codex Veronensis vgmss Syriac Sinaiticus syrpal arm geo Diatessaron.

History 

According to the colophon it was written in Salerno, in 1020. The name of the scribe was Michael.

The manuscript was examined and described by Peter P. Dubrovsky and Eduard de Muralt.

The manuscript was added to the list of New Testament manuscripts by Scrivener (number 196) and Gregory (number 253).

The manuscript is sporadically cited in the critical editions of the Greek New Testament (UBS3).

Currently the codex is housed at the Russian National Library (Gr. 71) in Saint Petersburg.

See also 

 List of New Testament lectionaries
 Biblical manuscript
 Textual criticism
 Lectionary 252

Notes and references

Bibliography 

 Eduard de Muralt, Catalogue des manuscrits grecs de la Bibliothèque Impériale publique (Petersburg 1864), pp. 41–42 (as LXXI)

Greek New Testament lectionaries
11th-century biblical manuscripts
National Library of Russia collection